Gert Korthof is a Dutch biologist who was trained at Utrecht University. He has reviewed various books of evolution, creationism, and intelligent design, including Michael Behe's The Edge of Evolution. He contributed to Why Intelligent Design Fails: A Scientific Critique of the New Creationism.

References

External links
 WasDarwinWrong.com  Towards The Third Evolutionary Synthesis

1949 births
Living people
Critics of creationism
Dutch biologists
Evolutionary biologists
Utrecht University alumni